Al-Khisas (Khirbat Khisâs) was a Palestinian Arab village located  northeast of Gaza near the modern city of Ashkelon.

Location
Al-Khisas was located just west of Ni'ilya, south of Al-Jura.

History
In 1838,  in the late Ottoman era,   el Khusas was noted as a place "in ruins or deserted," located in the Gaza district.

An official Ottoman  village list from about 1870  showed that  Chasas had 6 houses and a population of 35, though the population count included men, only.

In 1883, the PEF's Survey of Western Palestine  found at Khurbet el Khesas "a few heaps of stones with a well near."

British Mandate era
The modern village was classified as a hamlet in the Palestine Index Gazetter, and was built after World War I. Farmers from neighboring areas first built temporary huts at the site to shelter themselves during the harvest, gradually they settled and built adobe houses. The population relied on neighboring villages Al-Jura and Ni'ilya for medical, educational and administrative services. 

In the 1922 census of Palestine, conducted by the  British Mandate  authorities,  Khesas had a population of 102 inhabitants,  all Muslims, increasing in the 1931 census  to 133, still all Muslims, in  26 houses.

In  the  1945 statistics,  Al-Khisas had a population of 150 Muslims  with a total of  6,269  dunams of land, according to an official land and population survey. Of this,  191 dunums of village land were used for citrus and bananas, 419  for cereal farming, 2,671  irrigated or used for orchards, while  10  dunams  were built-up land.

1948 and aftermath
The village was depopulated during the 1948 Arab-Israeli War between November 4–5, 1948 at the end of Operation Yo'av. The Israeli army found about 150 people in Al-Khisas and nearby Ni'ilya;  they were all expelled to Beit Hanoun on the Gaza strip.

In 1992 the village site  was described as being "engulfed by the Israeli town of Ashkelon."

References

Bibliography

External links
 Welcome To al-Khisas
 Khirbet al-Khisas,  Zochrot
Survey of Western Palestine, Map 19:   IAA, Wikimedia commons 
 al-Khisas from the Khalil Sakakini Cultural Center
   

Arab villages depopulated during the 1948 Arab–Israeli War
District of Gaza